Bachelor of Malaysia 2018, the 2nd edition of the Bachelor of Malaysia pageant was be held in Sibu, Sarawak. Twenty-four contestants from different states in Malaysia competed.

Results

Contestants

References 

2018 in Malaysia
Beauty pageants in Malaysia
Sibu